Morten Dahlin (born 1 May 1989 in Hvidovre) is a Danish politician, who is a member of the Folketing for the Venstre political party. He was elected into parliament at the 2019 Danish general election.

Political career
Dahlin was elected into the municipal council of Greve Municipality at the 2017 Danish local elections.

Dahlin first ran for parliament in the 2015 general election, where he received 2,986 votes. This was not enough for a seat in parliament, although he became the primary substitute for Venstre in the Zealand constituency. He was not called upon during the 2015-2019 term however. He ran again in the 2019 election, where he was elected with 6,471 votes.

External links 
 Biography on the website of the Danish Parliament (Folketinget)

References 

Living people
1989 births
People from Hvidovre Municipality
Venstre (Denmark) politicians
Danish municipal councillors
Members of the Folketing 2019–2022
Members of the Folketing 2022–2026